The 1896 Kentucky Derby was the 22nd running of the Kentucky Derby. The race took place on May 6, 1896. Accordingly, the winning horse, Ben Brush, set the then-current Derby record at that distance with a time of 2:07.75.

Full results

Winning breeder: Runnymede Farm (KY)

Payout
 The winner received a purse of $4,850.
 Second place received $700.
 Third place received $300.

References

1896
Kentucky Derby
Derby
May 1896 sports events
1896 in American sports